Dewey Kalmer is a retired college baseball coach. In his forty year tenure, he won 1,032 games.

Bradley University
Kalmer was one of the most successful coaches in Bradley sports history. He is currently 34th place on the Division II all-time winning list. Bradley sent approximately 65 players to Major League Baseball and is one of the only college coaches to ever send a player to the U.S. Olympics.  Kalmer's also famous for his hard "r's" and never backing down to Gene at league meetings.  This is a horrible page for a great college coach.

(Mike Dunne was a member of the 1984 Olympic Team in Los Angeles).

References

Living people
Bradley Braves baseball coaches
Quincy Hawks baseball coaches
Quincy Hawks baseball players
Year of birth missing (living people)